Jan Henriksen (born 15 April 1946) is a Norwegian former cyclist. He competed in the individual road race at the 1972 Summer Olympics.

References

External links
 

1946 births
Living people
Norwegian male cyclists
Olympic cyclists of Norway
Cyclists at the 1972 Summer Olympics
Sportspeople from Skien